The Bucentaur Returns to the Pier at the Doge's Palace or The Doge of Venice Departs for the Festival of the Betrothal of Venice to the Adriatic Sea is a c.1730 oil on canvas painting by Canaletto and was acquired together with his Reception of the French Ambassador in Venice in the 1760s it was acquired for the Hermitage Museum. In 1930 The Bucentaur was transferred to the Pushkin Museum in Moscow, where it remains. Variants of the work survive in several collections, including the Royal Collection at Windsor Castle, the Dulwich Picture Gallery and the Uffizi, whilst a copy by Fyodor Alekseyev is in the Russian Museum.

Bibliography (in Russian)
 Государственный музей изобразительных искусств имени А. С. Пушкина. Каталог живописи. — М.: Mazzotta, 1995. — С. 164. — 780 с. — ISBN 88-202-1163-7.
 От Тьеполо до Каналетто и Гварди. — М.: Арт Волхонка, 2018. — С. 128–131. — 200 с. — ISBN 978-5-906848-80-2.
 Фёдор Алексеев и его школа. — Государственная Третьяковская Галерея. — М.: Сканрус, 2004. — С. 32–33. — 200 с. — 3000 экз. — ISBN 5-93221-067-2.
 Маркова В. Венецианская ведута: образы времени. — М.: Арт Волхонка, 2018. — С. 48–63. — 128 с. — ISBN 978-5-906848-81-9.
 Штелин Я. Записки Якоба Штелина об изящных искусствах в России. — М.: Искусство, 1990. — Т. 2. — С. 127–128. — 248 с. — 25 000 экз.

Paintings by Canaletto
1730 paintings
Paintings in the collection of the Pushkin Museum